The VanFleet Hotel in Farmington, Utah was built during the 1860s for Thomas and Electra Hunt. Originally a residence, it became a hotel in the 1870s as a result of its proximity to a Wells Fargo stage coach  stop. It was purchased by Hyrum Van Fleet in 1908, but suffered a devastating fire in 1913.  The subsequent reconstruction doubled its size. As it was next to the courthouse, it became known as the "honeymoon hotel" as a result of the many newlyweds who stayed there. The Van Fleet family operated the hotel until 1953, when it was converted to apartments. It currently houses dental offices after a 1995 renovation. The building was listed on the National Register of Historic Places on December 19, 1991.

References

External links
 Official website of Rock Hotel Dental

Hotel buildings on the National Register of Historic Places in Utah
Georgian architecture in Utah
Hotel buildings completed in 1860
Hotels in Utah
National Register of Historic Places in Davis County, Utah
Buildings and structures in Farmington, Utah